Arbois is a commune in the Jura department in eastern France. It may also refer to:

 Arbois (grape), French white wine grape variety 
 Arbois AOC, viticultural appellation among the Jura wine regions